In mathematics, Birkhoff interpolation is an extension of polynomial interpolation. It refers to the problem of finding a polynomial p of degree d such that certain derivatives have specified values at specified points:

where the data points  and the nonnegative integers  are given. It differs from Hermite interpolation in that it is possible to specify derivatives of p at some points without specifying the lower derivatives or the polynomial itself. The name refers to George David Birkhoff, who first studied the problem.

Existence and uniqueness of solutions
In contrast to Lagrange interpolation and Hermite interpolation, a Birkhoff interpolation problem does not always have a unique solution.

An important problem in the theory of Birkhoff interpolation is to classify those problems that have a unique solution. Schoenberg formulates the problem as follows. Let d denote the number of conditions (as above) and let k be the number of interpolation points. Given a d-by-k matrix E, all of whose entries are either 0 or 1, such that exactly d entries are 1, then the corresponding problem is to determine p such that

The matrix E is called the incidence matrix. For example, the incidence matrices for the interpolation problems mentioned in the previous paragraph are:

Now the question is: does a Birkhoff interpolation problem with a given incidence matrix have a unique solution for any choice of the interpolation points?

The case with k = 2 interpolation points was tackled by George Pólya. Let Sm denote the sum of the entries in the first m columns of the incidence matrix:

Then the Birkhoff interpolation problem with k = 2 has a unique solution if and only if Sm ≥ m for all m. Schoenberg showed that this is a necessary condition for all values of k.

References
Interpolation